Katada Dam  is an earthfill dam located in Mie Prefecture in Japan. The dam is used for water supply. The catchment area of the dam is 29.5 km2. The dam can store 1478 thousand cubic meters of water. The construction of the dam was started on 1921 and completed in 1929.

See also
List of dams in Japan

References

Dams in Mie Prefecture